The Taba Border Crossing also known  as the Menachem Begin Crossing (formerly ) is an international border crossing between Taba, Egypt, and Eilat, Israel

History
Opened on April 26, 1982, it is currently the only entry/exit point between the two countries that handles tourists. The site is at the bottom of Mount Tallul and was close to Raffi Nelson's Nelson Village and the Sonesta Hotel which both closed due to the handing over of the Sinai to Egyptian control in exchange for normalization of relations. Under terms of the deal, Israelis would be able to visit the Red Sea coast from Taba to Sharm el-Sheikh (and Saint Catherine's Monastery) visa free for visits up to fourteen days. In 1999, the terminal handled a record amount of 1,038,828 tourists and 89,422 vehicles.

The terminal is open 24 hours a day, every day of the year except for the holidays of Eid ul-Adha and Yom Kippur.

In February 2014, a coach taking tourists to Saint Catherine's Monastery in Sinai exploded in Taba shortly before crossing the border to Israel. Three South Korean nationals and one Egyptian national were killed, while 14 South Koreans were injured; the blast was blamed on  terrorists.

In September 2016, the Israeli side of the crossing was renamed to "Menachem Begin Crossing" after the late prime minister, who signed the peace agreement between Israel and Egypt.

The crossing was closed for a week in April 2017 after bombing attacks at Coptic Orthodox churches in Egypt.

Israeli terminal
The Israeli border terminal was opened in September 1995 at a cost of US $3 million.

Services within the terminal
 Drive in stations for those traveling by car
 Change Place stand offering a money exchange
 James Richardson duty-free shop
 Cafeteria

Transportation to and from the terminal
The Israeli border terminal can be reached from within Israel via Egged bus number 15 from Eilat's central bus station. Privately owned Israeli cars may cross through the terminal and stay in the confines of the Egyptian border terminal (this includes the parking lots of the Hilton Taba and Mövenpick Taba Resort); further travel into the Sinai is possible after change of license plates, registration and the payment of a tax.

Israeli rental cars are not allowed to cross the border.

Passage fee
All travelers to Egypt must pay a border-crossing fee before leaving Israel.
The border-crossing fee is NIS 102 (December 2019) per traveler. The fee is quoted in NIS and is updated once a year (on January 1) linked to the Consumer Price Index. An additional service charge of 5 NIS (per payment, not per traveler) is payable regardless of the form of payment.

This means travelers to the Mövenpick Resort, Hilton Taba Resort Hotel, and Radisson Blue Resort Taba are exempt from any fees, but a printed reservation to the hotel must be shown at the border, otherwise the full fee is required.

Egyptian Terminal

Terminal
Though there is an ATM at the terminal, it is usually not in function so travelers should bring cash to exchange. The terminal building has an exchange counter.

Visa
Travelers will get a stamp on arrival allowing entry into the Sinai Peninsula for up to 14 days. With this stamp, travelers can travel as far as Sharm El Sheikh including St Catherine Monastery and visit Ras Mohamed Nature Reserve. There is no cost involved to get the stamp. Travel beyond into the rest of Egypt requires an Egyptian Visa that will need to be obtained in advance.

Passage fee
There is no fee when crossing back from Taba to Eilat.

See also
Eilat Airport
Eilat Ashkelon Pipeline Company
Eilot (kibbutz)
Ezion-Geber
Operation Uvda
Ovda Airport
Port of Eilat
Yotvata Airfield

Gallery

References

External links
 Taba Border Terminal info
US Consular Information Sheet - Israel, the West Bank and Gaza

Egypt–Israel border crossings
Eilat
Toll bridges